The 2004 Betfair Premier League was a professional non-ranking snooker tournament that was played from 10 January to 14 March 2004.

Stephen Hendry won in the final 9–6 against John Higgins.

Prize fund 
The breakdown of prize money for this year is shown below: 
Winner: £45,000
Runner-up: £20,000
Semi-final: £12,500
Frame-win: £500 (only in league phase)
Highest break: £6,000
Total: £180,000

League phase

Top four qualified for the play-offs. If points were level then most frames won determined their positions. If two players had an identical record then the result in their match determined their positions. If that ended 4–4 then the player who got to four first was higher. (Breaks above 50 shown between (parentheses); century breaks are indicated with bold.)

 10 January – Legends Sports Centre, Crewe, England
 Mark Williams 6–2 John Higgins → 19–91, 0-(143), 62–32, 58–2, (52) 74–0, (103) 114–0, (114)-14, (50) 66–6
 Stephen Hendry 7–1 Steve Davis → (84)-14, (59) 82–18, (105) 127–7, 5–70 (62), (55) 103–21, 84–0, (62) 63–0, (61) 62–20
 11 January – Legends Sports Centre, Crewe, England
 Marco Fu 5–3 Jimmy White → 69–65, (56) 61–41, 61–46, (62)-61, (85)-32, 56–63, 46–49, 20–72
 Paul Hunter 5–3 Steve Davis → 77–43, 43–71 (50), 0–108 (102), (52) 73–1, 83–26, 62–50, 11–81 (80), (90)-37
 Mark Williams 4–4 Stephen Hendry → 51–72, (90)-0, 55–67, 67–42, 58–23, (57)-(69), (84)-0, 24-(106)
 17 January – Greenock Sports Centre, Renfrew, Scotland
 Stephen Hendry 5–3 Paul Hunter → 75–52, 83–0, (64)-(66), 17–96 (65), 70–1, (56) 63–62, 0-(83), 66–23
 Steve Davis 5–3 Jimmy White → 0-(86), 59–32, 67–24, 63–48, (94)-1, 45–70 (50), (79) 84–0, 30–73 (68)
 John Higgins 6–2 Marco Fu → (68) 76–1, 64–0, 89–37, 66-(51), 66–54, 32–94, 74–20, 1-(106)
 18 January – Greenock Sports Centre, Renfrew, Scotland
 Mark Williams 4–4 Paul Hunter → 0–60, 70–52, 72–37, (73) 86–11, (91)-0, 34–68, 0-(141), 1-(72)
 John Higgins 5–3 Steve Davis → 75–14, 1–113 (104), 33–68, 0–66 (58), (65) 73–14, (75)-0, (64) 73–7, 67–66
 Jimmy White 5–3 Stephen Hendry → (64) 98–15, 66–8, (68) 90–4, (72)-9, 1–117 (116), 2–64, 75–37, 42–65
 14 February – Civic Hall, Trowbridge, England
 Stephen Hendry 5–3 Marco Fu → (76)-0, (92)-12, (72)-60, (73) 80–68, 0-(91), 59–1, 18–66, 28–61 (56)
 John Higgins 5–3 Jimmy White → 0–89 (62), 12–93 (64), 8–70, (110)-0, (88)-32, 86–34, (53) 58–22, 66–6
 15 February – Civic Hall, Trowbridge, England
 Mark Williams 6–2 Jimmy White → 70–6, 0-(83), 17–86 (63), (53) 99–11, (84)-15, (77) 78–0, (67)-14, (84) 120–0
 Marco Fu 6–2 Steve Davis → 11–81, (123)-9, 66–1, (140)-0, (74, 56) 130–4, (100)-0, 48–85 (76), (79)-0
 John Higgins 6–2 Paul Hunter → 5–88 (64), (80)-0, (73)-21, (135)-4, (96)-0, 70-(56), 67–66 (62), 7-(120)
 21 February – Peterlee Leisure Centre, Peterlee, England
 Marco Fu 5–3 Mark Williams → (96) 101–0, (66) 74–53, 56–70, (120)-0, (129) 133–12, 25–66, 43–65 (64), (59) 65–13
 Paul Hunter 4–4 Jimmy White → 39–72, (51) 88–47, 76-(58), (54)-74 (66), 71–34, 1–116 (109), (94)-0, 9–78
 22 February – Peterlee Leisure Centre, Peterlee, England
 Mark Williams 5–3 Steve Davis → 48–58, 64–56, (94) 123–8, (118) 124–0, 64–61 (52), (75) 99–0, 13–61, 23–58
 Marco Fu 5–3 Paul Hunter → 0-(135), (73) 81–15, 61–6, 45–79, (70) 81–15, (102)-36, 0-(146), (120)-13
 Stephen Hendry 4–4 John Higgins → 53–64, (76) 82–24, (53) 77–33, (88)-0, 5–105 (97), 40–76, 0–101 (90), 84- 15

Play-offs 
13–14 March – Colwyn Bay Leisure Centre, Colwyn Bay, Wales

*(80)-1, (79)-9, (68)-16, (85) 94–27, 0–77, 77–4, (81) 104–0
**21–65, (83)-0, (89) 90–1, (64)-65, (81) 104–0, 56–14, 17–76, (95)-40, 45–64, 53–52 (50)
***60-(62), (134)-0, 33–95 (70), 0-(88), (52) 66–4, 0–87 (86), 0-(80), (74) 78–4, 1–71 (70), 27–56 (55), 80–0, 18-(83), (67) 73–7, (69)-(59), 24–81 (57)

Century breaks
The highest break was worth £6,000.

146, 141, 135, 120  Paul Hunter
143, 135, 134, 110  John Higgins
140, 129, 123, 120, 120, 106, 102, 100  Marco Fu
116, 106, 105  Stephen Hendry
118, 114, 103  Mark Williams
109  Jimmy White
104, 102  Steve Davis

References

2004
Premier League
Premier League Snooker